Marc Martel is a Canadian Christian rock musician. In 1999, he formed the band Downhere before going solo in 2013. Aside from his own work, Martel is known for his Queen covers and his vocal likeness to frontman Freddie Mercury. He provided Mercury's singing voice in the film Bohemian Rhapsody.

Beginnings
He was born in Montreal, Canada to Michel Martel and his wife Barbara Beresford Martel. He attended Briercrest College and Seminary in Caronport, Saskatchewan where  he met his roommate Jason Germain. With him and a few friends he formed the band downhere.

Career

Downhere (1999–2012)

Downhere (stylized as downhere) developed their sound while touring on behalf of Briercrest College. After four years of college, the band relocated to Nashville, Tennessee, where they signed with Word Records. Downhere went on to win multiple Juno Awards, Covenant Awards and a Dove Award. They released 10 albums, including On the Altar of Love, before going on hiatus effective January 1, 2013.

Solo (2013–present)

In September 2011, Martel entered a competition to join Roger Taylor's (original drummer for the rock band Queen) official Queen tribute project, the Queen Extravaganza, with a video of Martel singing along with the Queen classic "Somebody to Love". It generated more than one million views on YouTube after being up for only a few days and  it has over 22 million views. This led to an appearance on The Ellen DeGeneres Show a week following the release of the video. Martel went on to be one of the winners of the competition which led to a six-week tour with The Queen Extravaganza in 2012. The Queen Extravaganza had continued to tour with Martel until the end of 2016.

Martel released an EP, Prelude, on February 1, 2013 The EP was recorded in Nashville and Los Angeles with producer John Fields. His full-length debut, Impersonator, released on September 30, 2014.

In September 2016, he collaborated on "Last Christmas", featured in the video game, Just Dance 2017. On November 18, 2016 The Silent Night EP, a collection of Christmas songs, was released.

In 2017, Martel left Queen Extravaganza and joined the Ultimate Queen Celebration.

In 2019, Martel recorded a new version of "Silver Bells" with Amy Grant and Michael W. Smith that reached No. 1 on the Billboard Christian AC Monitor charts, and the Mediabase Christian AC. This was Martel's first career No. 1 song. He accompanied them on their annual Christmas Tour.

Martel contributed vocal recordings for the Queen biographical film, Bohemian Rhapsody (2018). Film producer Graham King confirmed that Marc Martel recorded vocals for the film in a Rolling Stone article:Most singing scenes in the movie rely on either vocal stems from Queen master tapes or new recordings by Marc Martel, a Canadian Christian rock singer whose voice is practically identical to the late frontman's. "Literally, you could close your eyes and it's Freddie," says King. "And that's a very tough thing to do."And in an interview to FilmJournal International he revealed more details about Martel's involvement in the making of the film:Rami sings a little bit in the film, there's a lot of Freddie Mercury obviously, and a lot of Marc Martel. He sent a video to Brian May and Roger Taylor and he sounds exactly like Freddie Mercury. We knew that we had someone we could use for parts that maybe Rami couldn't do and obviously Freddie didn't do. So we were in Abbey Road recording studio for maybe two and a half months with Marc and with Rami, recording bits and pieces that we knew we needed. It's hard to find someone who can sing like Freddie Mercury and I'm not sure the movie would have happened if we didn't have Marc.Martel resides in Nashville, Tennessee, with his wife, Crystal.

He has also done voice work as Withered Foxy in the 2016 video game Five Nights at Freddy's World.

Discography 
With downhere
 downhere (independent, 1999)
 downhere (2001)
 So Much for Substitutes (2003)
 Wide-Eyed and Mystified (2006)
 Wide-Eyed and Simplified (2007)
 Thunder After Lightning (The Uncut Demos) (2007)
 Thank You for Coming (The Live Bootlegs) (2008)
 Ending Is Beginning (2008, review)
 How Many Kings: Songs for Christmas (2009)
 Two at a Time: Sneak Peeks & B-Sides (2010)
 On the Altar of Love (2011)

Solo
 The Prelude EP (2013)
 The Silent Night EP (2016)
 Impersonator (2014)
 Live at the High Watt (2016)
 A Night at the Apollo (2017)
 The First Noel EP (2017)
 My Way Vol. 1 EP (2018)
 Thunderbolt & Lightning (2018)
 Christmas Is Here EP (2018)
 The Christmas Collection (2019)
 Live in Auckland New Zealand featuring UQC (2020)
 A One Take Rhapsody (2020)
 Thank God It's Christmas (2020)
 Forte (2021)
 Hark! (2021)
 My Way Vol. 2 (2022)
 The Christmas Collection, Vol. 2 (2022)

Singles
 "Cual Otro Rey" (2020)
 "Fat Bottomed Girls" (2020)
 "Under Pressure" (2020)
 "Somebody to Love" (2021)
 "Seven Seas of Rhye/Bicycle Race" (2021)
 "Let Me Entertain You" (2021)
 "Another One Bites the Dust" (2022)

References

External links
 

Living people
1976 births
Canadian Christians
Canadian rock singers
Canadian rock guitarists
Canadian rock pianists
Canadian male singer-songwriters
Canadian singer-songwriters
Juno Award winners
Performers of Christian rock music
Singers from Montreal
Canadian male guitarists
Canadian male pianists
21st-century Canadian pianists
21st-century Canadian guitarists
21st-century Canadian male singers